Arima, officially The Royal Chartered Borough of Arima is the easternmost and second largest in area of the three boroughs of Trinidad and Tobago. It is geographically adjacent to Sangre Grande and Arouca at the south central foothills of the Northern Range. To the south is the Caroni–Arena Dam. Coterminous with Town of Arima since 1888, the borough of Arima is the fourth-largest municipality in population in the country (after Port of Spain, Chaguanas and San Fernando). The census estimated it had 33,606 residents in 2011.

In 1887, the town petitioned Queen Victoria for municipal status as part of her Golden Jubilee celebration. This was granted in the following year, and Arima became a Royal Borough on 1 August 1888.  Historically the third-largest town of Trinidad and Tobago, Arima is fourth since Chaguanas became the largest town in the country.

Geography

Climate 
The borough has a tropical rainforest climate (Köppen Af), bordering on a tropical monsoon climate, characterised with little seasonal variations due to its close proximity to the Northern Range. Temperatures typically range from 20 to 31 degrees Celsius, and annual rainfall averages around 2000 millimeters. The wet season lasts from June to November, and although there is no true dry season, there is a noticeably drier stretch from January to April. Hail has occurred in the town but is rare.

Culture and entertainment
 
Arima hosts an annual Borough Day anniversary celebration in August. The celebration incorporates Carnival-style street parades and usually coincides with the staging of the Santa Rosa Carib Community annual festival. The annual Arima Carnival includes street parades of masqueraders on Carnival Tuesday, J'ouvert bands on Carnival Monday, as well as a local calypso competition.

Demographics

Ancestry

Transportation

Highways and roads
The major land transportation arteries are the Churchill–Roosevelt Highway, Eastern Main Road and the Priority Bus Route which all link Arima with major towns and cities along the East–West Corridor metropolitan area. Among other important routes are the Arima Bypass, Cocorite Street, Tumpuna Road and O'Meara Road which links neighbourhoods around the town to the Town Center.

Transit
Arima plays an important role for north-eastern Trinidad as a multi-modal transportation hub for many of the towns and neighbourhoods on the eastern side of the island. A bus terminal provides service by the PTSC Bus network to Sangre Grande, Mundo Nuevo, Blanchisseuse, Carapo, Malabar, Morne La Croix, La Horquetta, Wallerfield Brasso Seco and to the capital Port of Spain.

Maxi taxis (private, owner-operated minibuses) operate throughout Trinidad and Tobago as a kind of semi-public transport. They operate along fixed routes, have fixed fares and meeting points, but do not operate under a fixed schedule. These maxi taxis  provide services from the town center to Port of Spain via the Priority Bus Route and Churchill-Roosevelt Highway, making stops along the East–West Corridor. They also provide transport to Sangre Grande.

Sports 

The major national super-league team, FC Santa Rosa and Arima Football League, which is based at the Arima Velodrome.

Abilene Wildcats Athletic Club, Trinity College East Athletics Club, Silver Bullets Athletic Club, D'Abadie Progressive Athletic Club, and Spartans High Speed Performance Athletic Club are also based in Arima.

Most suburbs, communities and neighbourhoods around the Borough have their own sporting complexes and community swimming pools.

The three major sporting arenas in Arima are:

The Larry Gomes Stadium
Arima Velodrome
Santa Rosa Race Track                                                                                                                                                                  
Sunil Narine and Larry Gomes are West Indies cricket players born in Arima.

Attractions 
Asa Wright Nature Centre, located in Arima Valley, it has a nature walk and swimming at a natural stream pool.
Santa Rosa Carib Centre, located on Paul Mitchell Road, off De Gannes Street in Arima, it contains items from Arima's native Carib history and is the headquarters of the Carib Queen. It also has displays about Carib descendants in Arima. Native items are also available for purchase.
Cleaver Woods, it has nature walks and Amerindian exhibits.

Utilities

Electric generation is handled by Powergen, while electrical distribution is handled by the Trinidad and Tobago Electricity Commission (T&TEC). Powergen has natural gas fired generation plants at Point Lisas, Penal, and Wrightson Road in Port of Spain. Additional power can be supplied from power generation facilities controlled by Inncogen at Point Lisas.

Telecommunications are regulated by the Telecommunications Authority of Trinidad and Tobago (TATT). It has been working to break up the monopoly, granting several new licences in 2005 to new companies in the market. Fixed-line telephone service is a monopoly controlled by Telecommunications Services of Trinidad and Tobago (TSTT). Licenses have been granted for competition in this area, but start-up is a while away. Wireless telephony is controlled by TSTT and bmobile, as well as Digicel, which came later. Licenses have been granted for a private company, Laqtel, to offer wireless service in competition with TSTT and Digicel. However, Laqtel had its licence revoked, and is undergoing severe financial difficulties.

Digital cable television is provided by Flow. High-speed internet service of up to 100Mbit/s and digital landline telephone service are all available in Arima.

Water and sewerage are under the purview of the Water and Sewerage Authority of Trinidad and Tobago (WASA).

Education
There are several primary (private and public) and secondary educational institutions in Arima, and some post-secondary level technical training institutes. St. Joseph's Convent in Arima was closed many years ago and the building now houses a retreat centre called Emmaus Centre.

Schools

Primary
Arima Hindu Primary School
Arima Boys' Government Primary School
Arima Boys' R.C. Primary School
Arima Centenary Government Primary School
Arima Girls' Government Primary School
Arima Girls' R.C. Primary School
Arima New Government Primary School
Arima Presbyterian Primary School
Arima West Government Primary School
Christian Primary Academy
EdenWay Pre-Primary Christian School
Giuseppi Preparatory
Malabar Government Primary School
Malabar R.C. Primary School
New Dawn Preparatory
Santa Rosa Government Primary School
St. Hilary's Preparatory

Secondary
Arima Government Secondary School
Arima Senior Comprehensive (now Arima North Secondary School)
Holy Cross College
Arima Central Secondary School

Post-secondary Institutions
Ambi's Career Institute
College of Professional Studies
Zenith Educational Institute

Gallery

References

External links 

 Arima Borough Corporation Official website
 Articles from Nalis marking Arima's 112th anniversary as a borough.
 Article from Nalis marking Arima's 109th anniversary as a borough.
 Some pictures of Arima from TriniView.com showing many streets.
 Cleaver Woods at wcities.com
 Santa Rosa Carib Community
 Newsday: Arima Carnival Results
 Guanaguanare – the Laughing Gull. Carib Indians in Trinidad – includes 2 videos

 
Populated places in Trinidad and Tobago
Municipalities of Trinidad and Tobago
Populated places established in 1757
1757 establishments in the Spanish West Indies